The Russian Fencing Federation is the governing body for the sport of fencing in Russia. It was created proper in 1992, but its previous incarnation was affiliated to the Fédération Internationale d'Escrime (FIE) in 1914. FFR is a member of the European Fencing Confederation and of the Russian Olympic Committee.

Russian oligarch Alisher Usmanov was president of the Russian Fencing Federation from 2001 to 2009 before being elected president of the International Fencing Federation (FIE).

In reaction to the 2022 Russian invasion of Ukraine, the FIE agreed with the European Fencing Confederation to ban Russian fencers, and reallocated competitions that were due to be held in Russia. On 10 March 2023, the FIE became the first Olympic governing body to officially reinstate Russian and Belarusian athletes and officials, in time for the start of the qualification for the 2024 Summer Olympics.

In June 2022, Stanislav Pozdnyakov, the Russian Olympic Committee (ROC) President, was removed from his position as European Fencing Confederation (EFC) President at an Extraordinary Congress following a unanimous vote of no confidence in Pozdnyakov in March 2022, due to his xenophobic conduct in the wake of the  Russian invasion of Ukraine.

References

External links

National federations of the European Fencing Confederation
Fencing
Organizations based in Moscow
Sports organizations established in 1992